Lee Stafford (born 17 October 1966) is an English celebrity hairdresser.

Biography
Stafford was born in Leigh-on-Sea, Essex, and is of Jewish ancestry on his mother's side. He opened his hair salon, The House That Hair Built, in 1984, in Leigh-on-Sea, Essex. He opened his second salon in Aughton, Sheffield in 1992 called Geezers. His career took off in 1997 when he won the title of Men's British Hairdresser of the Year. In 2000 he opened his second hair salon in Wardour Street, London, W1. In 2001 Stafford launched his own range of haircare products. In 2007 he appeared on the BBC television series Celebrity Scissorhands where he trained celebrities such as Tamara Beckwith and 1980s pop star Steve Strange to cut hair. The programme raised money for the BBC's charity Children in Need. On 6 November 2011, Stafford featured on the Secret Millionaire television series on Channel 4. Stafford is married to model and The Real Hustle star Jessica-Jane Clement. Stafford appeared on Pointless Celebrities in 2013 and again in February 2017 (broadcast dates). He is a father of three children, a son, Angel, born in 2014 and a daughter, Elvis Annie-Jane, born in 2016. He announced he was expecting a third child with his wife in September 2016 and their daughter Sugar Mae was born in April 2017.

Awards list

Won
2006
 National Hairdressing Federation Celebrity Hairdresser Of The Year
 Hair Magazine Hairdresser Of The Year
2004
 Best British Hairdresser of 2004 – Fellowship of Hairdressers Awards
2001
 Influential Hairdresser – Creative HEAD magazine's Most Wanted Awards
1997
 Men's British Hairdresser of the Year 1997 – 1998

Business Award List
2009
 BHBA Business & Website Innovation of the year
2005
 The BHBA Salon Design Award 2005 for Brighton salon
2002
 Growing Business of the Year Award 2002
 Training and Development Award 2002
 Investors in People Award 2002
1999
 British Manager of the Year 1999 – 2000 (1 of 6 nominees)
 British Salon of the Year 1999 – 2000 (1 of 6 nominees)

Salon's Award List
2005
 The BHBA Salon Design Award 2005 for my Brighton salon
2002
 Growing Business of the Year Award 2002
 Training and Development Award 2002
 Investors in People Award 2002
1999
 British Manager of the Year 1999 – 2000 (one of six nominees)
 British Salon of the Year 1999 – 2000 (one of six nominees)

References

External links

Lee Stafford
Children in Need (Celebrity Scissor-hands)
BBC Lee Stafford

1966 births
Living people
People from Leigh-on-Sea
British hairdressers